Minuscule 527 (in the Gregory-Aland numbering), ε 147 (in the Soden numbering), is a Greek minuscule manuscript of the New Testament, on a parchment. Palaeographically it has been assigned to the 11th century. It was adapted for liturgical use. Scrivener labelled it by number 482. It has full marginalia.

Description 

The codex contains almost the complete text of the four Gospels on 216 parchment leaves (size ) with only two lacunae (Mark 16:17-20; John 19:29-21:25). It is written in one column per page, 24 lines per page.

There is also a division according to the Ammonian Sections (in Mark 233 Sections - the last in 16:8), with references to the Eusebian Canons.

There are textual corrections in the margin.

It has also a few lectionary markings, for liturgical use, added by a later hand.

Text 

The Greek text of the codex is a representative of the Byzantine text-type. Hermann von Soden classified it to the textual family Kx. Aland placed it in Category V.

According to the Claremont Profile Method it represents the textual family Kx in Luke 1; Luke 10 and Luke 20. It was corrected to the group Π268.

History 

The manuscript is dated by the INTF to the 11th century.

In 1727 the manuscript was brought from the Pantokrator monastery on the Mount Athos to England. The manuscript was added to the list of New Testament minuscule manuscripts by F. H. A. Scrivener (482) and C. R. Gregory (527). Gregory saw it in 1883.

It is currently housed at the Bodleian Library (MS. Cromwell 15) in Oxford.

See also 

 List of New Testament minuscules
 Biblical manuscript
 Textual criticism

References

Further reading 

 

Greek New Testament minuscules
11th-century biblical manuscripts
Bodleian Library collection